Kuala Lumpur International Airport may refer to:
Kuala Lumpur International Airport, serving Kuala Lumpur for domestic and international flights since 1998
Sultan Abdul Aziz Shah Airport, formerly serving Kuala Lumpur for international flights from 1965 to 1998, now serving turboprop only
Simpang Airport,  formerly serving Kuala Lumpur for international flights from 1952 to 1965, now in use by the Royal Malaysian Air Force